Öja is an island in the Gulf of Bothnia in Kokkola (Karleby) municipality, Finland.

Öja was an independent municipality until 1969, when it was consolidated to Kaarlela. Kaarlela was consolidated to Kokkola in 1977.

Populated places disestablished in 1969
Former municipalities of Finland
Kokkola
Finnish islands in the Baltic
Landforms of Central Ostrobothnia